Fred Provo (April 17, 1922–June 6, 1999) was a halfback in the National Football League. He was drafted by the Green Bay Packers in the fourteenth round of the 1948 NFL Draft and played that season with the team.

References

1922 births
1999 deaths
Players of American football from Seattle
American football halfbacks
Washington Huskies football players
Green Bay Packers players